Sebkha  is a suburb of Nouakchott and urban commune in western Mauritania. It has a population of 63,474.

The football teams ASC Nasr de Sebkha and ASC Socogim are based there.

References

Communes of Mauritania
Nouakchott